Miss Earth Sweden was a beauty pageant for Swedish females between 18–27 years old. The pageant was until 2013 sponsored by Carousel Production Inc.. The winner of the pageant competes in the global beauty pageant, Miss Earth, held each year in the Philippines.

The main issues of the contest are environmental causes and the preservation of the Earth.

The Swedish supervisor of the franchise was, until 2011, Roberto Strindstedt.

In 2011, the Miss Universe Sweden organization bought the rights for crowning Miss Earth Sweden, and for Miss Earth 2011 they choose Renate Cerljen.

Titleholders

References

External links

Miss Earth Sweden
Sweden
Swedish awards